Dan Collins is a senior producer for CBS News.com. Previously, he was a New York correspondent for U.S. News & World Report and a reporter for the New York Daily News.

Career
Collins served in the US Army. Collins works as the New York Editor for the Huffington Post. His work has appeared in The New York Times, the Los Angeles Times, the Village Voice, and many others. At CBS News, Collins is responsible for running the hard news operation at the web site.

Family
He is married to Gail Collins, a columnist at The New York Times.

Selected bibliography
He is the author of several books including one with his wife and one with Wayne Barrett of the Village Voice. He has co-authored the following books:
Grand Illusion: The Untold Story of Rudy Giuliani and 9/11 (HarperCollins, 2006) [with Wayne Barrett]
The Millennium Book - Your Essential All-Purpose Guide for the Year 2000 [with Gail Collins]
"I, Koch"
"In the Name of the Law"

References

Sources
Harpercollins.com

American television journalists
Living people
Place of birth missing (living people)
Year of birth missing (living people)
American male journalists